Zap Mama is the music act of Belgian artist Marie Daulne. Zap Mama sings polyphonic and afro-pop music, a harmonic music with a mixture of infused African vocal techniques, urban, hip hop with emphasis on voice. The worldwide success of Zap Mama, and an ensemble of female polyphonic singers, inspired influences in American hip hop, nu-soul, jazz and elements of pop. The evolving musical compositions created a diverse band of singers and musicians for Zap Mama.

"The voice is an instrument itself," says Daulne. "It's the original instrument. The primary instrument. The most soulful instrument, the human voice. Singing songs in French and English with African World Music Roots."

Sources of Zap Mama's music
Sources of Zap Mama's music include Daulne's roots in the Democratic Republic of Congo, her upbringing in Belgium, and her return to Africa to rediscover her musical roots.

Democratic Republic of Congo
Marie Daulne, the daughter of a Belgian father and a Congolese mother, was born in the East Zaire City of Isiro. Marie had only been born a few days when her father was killed by the Simba rebels, during the Congo Crisis. The Crisis resulted in the deaths of some 100,000 people. It led to the assassination of Prime Minister Patrice Lumumba, as well as a traumatic setback to the United Nations, following the death of UN Secretary General Dag Hammarskjöld in a plane crash as he sought to mediate. Marie's mother, with brother and sisters had to survive hiding in the forest.  Several months later, they were airlifted out to Isiro in an emergency evacuation by Belgian paratroopers. Marie and her family were flown to Belgium, because her father was a Belgian citizen.

Belgium
Growing up in Belgium was not easy for the family.  "There were few black people in Belgium," says Daulne. "It became easier as I grew older". There were black role models seen in music and sports. In the home, the Congolese culture remained present through traditional songs, which her mother and sisters sang together. The loving paternal family of Marie's Belgian father, provided liturgical music and the Walloon popular songs. From early adolescence, Marie trained and competed in track, field and volleyball with athletic aspirations to one day compete in the International Olympics. . Marie is a graduate of the Academie Royale des Beaux Arts de Bruxelles and the Nationale Superieure des Arts Visuales de La Cambre.  Daulne also trained in modern dance, choreography and acrobatics at the Ecole du Cirque, and briefly attended the Antwerp School of Jazz.

Although Daulne remembers that her mother sang some songs from Congo Kinshasa around the house, her mother did not teach them to the children, stressing mastery of French instead. Daulne listened to European music as she grew up. "We had the radio when I was growing up in Belgium, so we heard a lot of French music. And of course, American music was also very popular all over Europe. Since our mother did not want us to watch TV in our home, we entertained ourselves by creating our own music. We were very musical." Daulne was introduced to black music watching television. "When I was growing up, there weren't many black people in Europe -- my family was alone. Then I saw an American musical comedy with black people on TV. And I couldn't believe it. I said, "That's us!" My whole fantasy life was based on that movie." Daulne felt a special connection to blues songs like "Damn Your Eyes" by Etta James. "When I was a teenager I listened to a lot of American blues," she says. "That song brought me happiness while I was going through the pain of a broken love. It helped me to open the door and see the life in front of me. I sing it now and I hope, in my turn, that I can help another teenager to do the same if they are having pain from love."

When Daulne was 14 she went to England and first heard reggae. "I discovered Bob Marley -- my favorite album was Kaya. I know that whole album by heart." Then Daulne became interested in the rap music of Run-DMC and the Beastie Boys. "I was into breakdancing at the time. I formed a gang, and we would beatbox like the Americans, like the Fat Boys."

After Daulne left home she remembered the African songs her mother sang to her as a child. "When I left home, I missed those songs, and in the school choir, I wondered why we didn't use African harmonising. So my sister and I started to sing African melodies, and Zap Mama was born. I wrote my first song at 15, and my artist friend Nina said that what we were doing was amazing. She helped me to find a gig, and from that day, it has been non-stop." But Daulne didn't really get interested in singing until an accident left her unable to participate in athletics. "I wanted to be a runner, but then I broke my leg and I was finished with sports. I stayed at home, listening to music. I was recording sounds all the time -- I would listen to sounds repeating for hours. But there was something that I needed still, and that's when I decided to go to Africa, to the forest."

Return to Africa
In the documentary film Mizike Mama, Daulne and her family recall a reverse cultural tug-of-war for her allegiance during her childhood. Her mother feared that Daulne would grow up too African and so did not teach her tribal songs. However the Belgian side of her family encouraged Daulne to explore her African heritage. Daulne first heard a recording of traditional pygmy music when she was 20. She decided to return Congo-Kinshasa in 1984 to learn about her heritage and train in pygmy onomatopoeic vocal techniques. "When I went to the Congo, I hadn’t thought of being a musician. Not at all. But I was there, and I was standing in the middle of the forest, hearing the music that had been a part of my earliest memories, and it was like an illumination, like a light," Daulne said. Daulne made further trips to Africa. "I go all around Africa. I started where I was born, in the forest of Zaire. After that I branched out to West Africa, South Africa, East Africa. It [is] very easy for me to learn because all African cultures seem to have something in common the music and the voices," Daulne says. Although Daulne draws inspiration from Africa, she does not call Africa home. "You know when I went back to Congo, I thought I would have a welcome like I was part of the family, part of the country, but that was not the case," Daulne said. "They treated me like a Belgian come to visit as a tourist. I saw that that is not especially a place to call home."

Daulne's music has evolved over the years from an a cappella quintet to a lead voice accompanied by instruments. "I’m a nomad. I like to discover my sound with different instruments, different genres. For me it’s normal. My name is Zap Mama...it’s easy for me to zap in from one instrument to another, a culture, a style. I’m more a citizen of the world, not an American or Belgian." Zap Mama has released seven full-length albums: Zap Mama (1991) (re-released in 1993 as Adventures in Afropea 1, minus the single track Etupe), Sabsylma (1994), Seven (1997), A Ma Zone (1999), Ancestry in Progress (2004), Supermoon (2007), and ReCreation (2009) that fall into four cycles.

First Cycle: Adventures in Afropea 1 and Sabsylma
When Daulne returned to Belgium, she spent several years singing in Brussels in jazz cafes. In 1989, she founded the group Zap Mama to merge the African and European aspects of her identity. Daulne auditioned scores of female singers looking for the right combination of voices for an a cappella ensemble.  "When I did my first album, I was looking for girls that were the same mix as me--African and European," she says. "I wanted to put these two sounds together to prove that to have blood from white and black was perfect harmony on the inside." The five vocalists— Marie Daulne, her sister Anita Daulne, Sylvie Nawasadio, Sabine Kabongo, Angelique Willkie (who else? Céline T'hooft?) --combined the sounds of Congolese Pygmies with vocal styles of European choral traditions. The original idea of Zap Mama was "five singers who would be one," Marie Daulne said. "There is no chief." "The power of voices was my thing," Daulne said. "I wanted to show the world the capacity of five women exploring...our voices and our minds, nothing else."

Zap Mama performed their first concert in 1989. In 1991, the group recorded their first record, Zap Mama, at Studio Daylight in Brussels, Belgium. The album was released by Crammed Discs, the Belgian record label of Marc Hollander and Vincent Kenis (who produced the album).  In 1992, Zap Mama came to the United States for the first time to perform at New Music Seminar in New York. There, they met David Byrne and agreed to let him reissue Zap Mama's first recordings as Adventures in Afropea 1 on Luaka Bop Records. By the end of the year, Billboard announced it was the top seller for "world music."  Zap Mama went on tour, playing New York's Central Park, Paris' Olympia, the Montreux Jazz Festival. After the success of Adventures in Afropea 1, Zap Mama split from Luaka Bop Records over artistic difference. According to Daulne, the record company "wanted to mold us into a poppy girl band, but I said, 'No, you'll kill me', and I stopped. Everyone was asking why I wanted to stop when we'd finally arrived at the top. But I felt that it was completely wrong. I wasn't ready. I wasn't strong enough. The manager said that if I stopped then, I'd be killing my career, but it was my decision."

The next album Sabsylma (Crammed Discs, 1994) featured Indian, Moroccan, and Australian influences and earned Zap Mama a Grammy nomination for Best World Music Album. Daulne explained that the sharper sound of Sabsylma was due to the increasing influence of American music, as a result of being on the road. "We've been touring so intensively. Adventures in Afropea 1 was a soft, African record with a natural, round sound. Sabsylma is hectic, sharper. Not on purpose, mind you. I can't help it. If you're driving in a van for months, and you constantly hear the sounds of traffic, TV, hard rock on the radio ... those sounds hook up in your ears, and come out if you start to sing."

In the studio, Daulne used an organic process of improvisation to create her music. "I'm always looking for sounds. Most of the time, I work with colors. Each sound needs different colors of voices. I dissect sounds, cut them in little pieces, order them, and reassemble them," says Daulne. "During the rehearsals, we light some candles, start a tape-recorder, close our eyes, and start making up a story. On that, we start adding sounds. We let ourselves go. We are carried away by the music."

While Zap Mama worked on Sabsylma in the studio, Director Violaine de Villers made a documentary, Mizike Mama (1993), presenting a portrait of the group. The film focuses on Daulne as the driving force behind the group and discusses the implications of membership in a racially mixed group that consciously fuses African rhythms and vocal tones with European polyphony.

Second Cycle: Seven and A Ma Zone
After the success of the first two albums, Daulne put her career on hold for a few years to birth and mother her daughter Kesia. Upon returning to her music, Daulne moved in a new direction. She chose to record Seven as the sole remaining member of the original Zap Mama. Her music had evolved stylistically as well. Adventures in Afropea 1 and Sabsylma had both been largely a cappella, but Seven broke with the past by including male musicians and vocalists, an increased number of instruments, and more songs in English. "I'm looking for instruments that have vocal sounds, forgotten instruments like the guimbri... The first and second albums were about the voice, what came before. This album is about introducing those sounds into modern, Western life," says Daulne. The title of Seven (1997) refers to the seven senses of a human being. When Daulne traveled to Mali in 1996, she had learned the Malian belief that in addition to the five senses known in the West, some have a sixth sense of emotion. "But not everyone has the seventh. It is the power to heal with music, calm with color, to soothe the sick soul with harmony. [The man who taught me about this belief] told me that I have this gift, and I know what I have to do with it," Daulne says.

Daulne's next album was A Ma Zone (1999). The title is a wordplay meaning both "Amazone," the female warrior, and "A Ma Zone," (in my zone)  which "means that I feel at ease wherever I am," Daulne says. "Naturally an Amazon is a rebel, a fighter who, once she has set her heart on something, pulls out all the stops to achieve her goal. I feel this way as well when I'm standing on the stage with the group-- as a team we share the same aim of winning over the audience with our music," Daulne says. That same year, Zap Mama made "Iko-Iko" for Mission: Impossible 2 soundtrack, a cover of "Jock-A-Mo" by Sugar Boy & the Cane Cutters.

Third Cycle: Ancestry in Progress and Supermoon

Daulne moved to New York in 2000. "I've never been welcome in any country as my own country," says Daulne. "In Europe, they talk to me as if I'm from Congo. In Congo, they act like I'm from Europe. The first time I felt at home was in New York. I said, ‘Here is my country. Everybody is from somewhere else. I feel so comfortable here.'"

Ancestry in Progress (2004) reflects Daulne's new life in the United States, as it synthesizes her traditional African and European influences with American musical styles like hip-hop and R&B. "The American beat is a revolution all over the world," Daulne says. "Everybody listens to it and everybody follows it. But the beat of the United States was inspired by the beat coming from Africa. Not just its structure, but the sound of it. This is the source of modern sounds, the history of the beat, starting from little pieces of wood banging against one another, and arriving on the big sound-systems today. It's genius. So I wanted to create an album about the evolution of old ancestral vocal sounds, how they traveled from Africa, mixing with European and Asian sounds, and were brought to America." Ancestry in Progress (2004) reached #1 on the Billboard World Music Album chart. A music video for the single "Bandy Bandy," featuring Erykah Badu, directed by Bill Fishman and produced by David Herrera (music video director), aired on VH1.

After four years in the United States, Daulne moved back to Belgium and now calls Brussels home. "I lived in the United States from 2000 to 2004 and it is a place with so many stars. When I met a lot of big celebrities I realized I was not a big star and that I didn't want to be, because your life would be a habit, stuck in this and that. I prefer the singularity. I prefer to be me." Daule finds life easier in Belgium. "With my family...my children, the people I love — that is home." Daulne still draws inspiration from her travels. "Currently, I feel the need to go to England, because a lot of interesting things are happening over there. In my band, there are a lot of young musicians who teach me completely new things. They challenge me - and that is the way I like it," Daulne says.

In Supermoon (2007), Daulne's vocals take center stage. "When the audience appreciates the art of the artist, the audience becomes the sun and makes the artist shine as a full moon," says Daulne. Supermoon is also one of Daulne's most personal statements with songs like "Princess Kesia," an ode to her daughter and a reflection on her growth. "With Supermoon, I reveal the way I chose to live when I started my career,” says Daulne. “It’s very intimate…You’re seeing me very close up. I hope that’s a kind of intimacy that people will understand. I’m opening a door to who I am." "I always used to hide myself, and I'm not complaining about it, but now it is time to show my eyes and my femininity and my delicate side," said Daulne. "I am proud to be so feminine, because I have taken the time to develop...my femininity. Now that I have that, I can face anybody. And if anybody challenges me, there is no problem."

Fourth Cycle: ReCreation
In 2009, Zap Mama released her latest album, ReCreation, which celebrates her tradition of worldwide influences and expresses her new attitude toward her life and music. Daulne describes the inspiration behind the album as her realization that she was learning and experiencing "something new all the time." The album's title refers to recreation in two senses of the world, both as a renewal of the self and as pleasurable relaxation and enjoyment. Almost every song on the album features a collaboration with another artist, including G. Love, Vincent Cassel, and Bilal. ReCreation was nominated by the NAACP Image Awards for Outstanding World Music Album.

Discography
 Zap Mama (1991)
 Adventures in Afropea 1 (1993)
 Sabsylma (1994)
 Seven (1997)
 A Ma Zone (1999)
 Ancestry in Progress (2004)
 Supermoon (2007)
 ReCreation (2009)
 Eclectic Breath (2018)

Notable collaborations
 Google doodle for International Women's Day (2014)  
 G. Love, "Drifting," ReCreation (2009)
Vincent Cassel, "Paroles Paroles" and "Non Non Non," ReCreation (2009)
Bilal, "Sorrow, Tears & Blood", Love for Sale (2001–03)
Speech of Arrested Development, "I Wonder", The Grown Folks Table (2009); "Each Step Moves Us On," 1 Giant Leap 2 Sides 2 Everything Soundtrack (2008) and "W'happy Mama," A Ma Zone (1999)
Alanis Morissette, "Arrival," 1 Giant Leap 2 Sides 2 Everything Soundtrack (2008)
Michael Franti, "High Low," All Rebel Rockers (2009); "Hey Brotha," Supermoon (2007); "Listener Supporter," Stay Human (2001); "Poetry Man" and "Baba Hooker," Seven (1997)
Sérgio Mendes, "Waters of March," Encanto (2008)
Kery James, "Après la pluie," À l’ombre du show business (2008)
Tony Allen, "African Diamond," ReCreation (2009) and "1000 Ways," Supermoon (2007)
David Gilmore, "Toma Taboo," Supermoon (2007)
Arno, "Toma Taboo," Supermoon (2007) and "Brussels Mabel," Arno (2002)
Ladysmith Black Mambazo, "Hello to My Baby," Long Walk to Freedom (2006)
Carl Craig, "Bandy Bandy," Luaka Bop Remixes (2005)
Common, Talib Kweli, and ?uestlove, "Yelling Away," Soundbombing III (2002)/Ancestry in Progress (2004)
Questlove, Bahamadia, and Lady Alma, "Show Me the Way," Ancestry in Progress (2004)
Scratch, "Wadidyusay?," Ancestry in Progress (2004)
Erykah Badu, "Bandy Bandy," Ancestry in Progress (2004) and "Bump It," Worldwide Underground (2003)
Common, "Ferris Wheel," Electric Circus (2002)
DJ Krush, "Danger of Love," Zen (2001)
Black Thought, "Rafiki," A Ma Zone (1999)
The Roots, "Act Won (Things Fall Apart)," Things Fall Apart (1999)
Boyd Jarvis, "Alibokolijah," Alibokolijah (1999)
Maria Bethânia, "Glytzy," Ambar (1997)
King Britt, "Poetry Man," Seven (1997)
U-Roy, "New World," Seven (1997)
Dana Bryant, "Food," Wishing from the Top (1996)

Music in film, television, and video games
Metisse/Cafe au Lait ("Take Me Coco")
EA Sports' FIFA 10 ("Vibrations")
So You Think You Can Dance ("Take Me Coco," "Moonray" and "W'happy Mama")
Cashmere Mafia ("1000 Ways")
Brothers & Sisters ("Supermoon")
MTV's Road Rules ("Rafiki")
MTV's 9th Annual Music Awards ("Iko Iko")
Sesame Street ("Brrrlak")
The Man ("Bandy Bandy")
The God Who Wasn't There ("A Way Cuddy Dis")
In the Cut ("Allo Allo")
Tortilla Soup ("Call Waiting")
Mission: Impossible 2 ("Iko Iko")
La Haine ("J'attends," "Discussion," and "Songe")
Elle Magazine commercial ("Sweet Melodie")
Mercedes-Benz commercial ("Din Din")
Nokia 7250 commercial ("Take Me Coco")
BMW commercial ("Danger of Love")
Fiat commercial ("Allo Allo")
Where in the World Is Carmen Sandiego? ("Brrrlak")

References

External links
 Official website
 Official website

Belgian musical groups
Heads Up International artists
Luaka Bop artists
World music groups